Phyllorhynchus is a genus of snakes in the family Colubridae. The genus is native to the southwestern United States and adjacent northwestern Mexico

Species
The genus Phyllorhynchus contains two species which are recognized as being valid.
Phyllorhynchus browni 
Phyllorhynchus decurtatus 

Nota bene: A binomial authority in parentheses indicates that the species was originally described in a genus other than Phyllorhynchus.

Etymology
The specific name, browni, is in honor of American ornithologist Herbert Brown (1848–1913), who collected the holotype.

Description
Snakes of the genus Phyllorhynchus are heavy-bodied, but small,  in total length, which includes a short tail. The snout is short and shovel-like. The rostral scale is enlarged and has free lateral edges.

References

Further reading
 Tucson Herpetological Society: Saddled Leaf-Nosed Snake
Cope ED (1868). "Sixth Contribution to the Herpetology of Tropical America". Proceedings of the Academy of Natural Sciences of Philadelphia 20: 305–313. (Phimothyra decurtata, new species, pp. 310–311).
Stebbins RC (2003). A Field Guide to Western Reptiles and Amphibians, Third Edition. The Peterson Field Guide Series ®. Boston and New York: Houghton MifflinCompany. xiii + 533 pp. . (Phyllorhynchus browni, pp. 349–350 + Plate 47 + Map 135; P. decurtatus, p. 349 + Plate 47 + Map 136).
Stejneger L (1890). "On a new genus and species of Colubrine snakes from North America". Proceedings of the United States National Museum Museum 13: 151–155. (Phyllorhynchus, new genus, p. 151; P. browni, new species, pp. 152–153).

Phyllorhynchus
Snake genera